Charles Emmett Quigg (September 30, 1851 – February 12, 1909) was an American physician and politician.

Born in Ticonderoga, New York, Quigg went to Belfast Medical School and then to Bennett Medical College in Chicago, Illinois. In 1880, Quigg settled in Tomah, Wisconsin and practiced medicine. Quigg served as Mayor of Tomah from 1888 to 1890 In 1893, Quigg served in the Wisconsin State Assembly as a Democrat. Quigg died in Tomah, Wisconsin in 1909.

Notes

1851 births
1909 deaths
People from Ticonderoga, New York
People from Tomah, Wisconsin
Physicians from Wisconsin
Mayors of places in Wisconsin
Democratic Party members of the Wisconsin State Assembly
19th-century American politicians